Geoffrey Sayre-McCord (né McCord, born December 10, 1956) is an American philosopher who works in moral theory, ethics, meta-ethics, the history of ethics, and epistemology. He teaches at the University of North Carolina, Chapel Hill. He is also the director of the Philosophy, Politics and Economics Society.

Education and career

Sayre-McCord received his BA from Oberlin College and his PhD (under the direction of David Gauthier) from the University of Pittsburgh. Sayre-McCord is the Morehead-Cain Alumni Distinguished Professor of Philosophy and Director of the Philosophy, Politics, and Economics Program at the University of North Carolina, where he has taught since 1985. He was a Professorial Fellow at the University of Edinburgh from 2013-2016, and a Laurance S. Rockefeller Visiting Professor at Princeton University in 2015-2016. He is a frequent visitor at the Australian National University and has been a visiting professor at the University of Auckland and the University of California/Irvine.

Awards

Sayre-McCord is the recipient of several university-wide teaching awards at the University of North Carolina, including the Board of Governors' Award for Excellence in Teaching. 

In 2019 Sayre-McCord received the Philip L. Quinn Prize from the American Philosophical Association, for “service to philosophy and philosophers, broadly construed.” In 2022, he received the University of North Carolina's Thomas Jefferson awarded to "that member of the academic community who through personal influence and performance of duty in teaching, writing, and scholarship has best exemplified the ideals and objectives of Thomas Jefferson.”

Family

Sayre-McCord's parents were William Maxwell McCord and Joan McCord, both of whom were college professors. His brother is Rob McCord, a former Pennsylvania Treasurer. He is married to Harriet Sayre, the daughter of Francis Bowes Sayre Jr. and great-granddaughter of President Woodrow Wilson.

Philosophical work

Sayre-McCord is known especially for his work on moral realism and on David Hume's moral theory.  He is author of the Stanford Encyclopedia of Philosophy entries on "Moral Realism" and "Metaethics". He has also written on contractualism and on issues at the intersection of philosophy, politics, and economics. He was, for five years, a co-editor of the journal Noûs.

Publications

Selected articles 
"Coherence and Models for Moral Theorizing," Pacific Philosophical Quarterly (1985)
"Deontic Logic and the Priority of Moral Theory," Noûs (1986)
"The Many Moral Realisms," Southern Journal of Philosophy, Spindel Conference Supplement, (1986) 
"Moral Theory and Explanatory Impotence," Midwest Studies (1988)
"Deception and Reasons to be Moral," American Philosophical Quarterly, (1989)
"Functional Explanations and Reasons as Causes," Philosophical Perspectives (1990) 
"Being a Realist about Relativism," Philosophical Studies (1991) 
"Normative Explanations," Philosophical Perspectives (1992) 
"On Why Hume's General Point of View Isn't Ideal -- and Shouldn't Be," Social Philosophy and Policy (1994) 
"Coherentist Epistemology and Moral Theory," in Moral Knowledge?, ed. by Sinnott-Armstrong and Timmons (1996)
"Hume and the Bauhaus Theory of Ethics," Midwest Studies (1996) 
"Hume's Representation Argument Against Rationalism," Manuscrito (1997)
"The Meta-Ethical Problem," Ethics (1997) 
"'Good' on Twin Earth," Philosophical Issues (1997) 
"Contractarianism," Blackwell Guide to Ethical Theory (1999)
"Criminal Justice and Legal Reparations," Philosophical Issues (2001) 
"Mill's 'Proof': A More than Half-Hearted Defense," Social Philosophy and Policy (2001) 
"On the Relevance of Ignorance to the Demands of Morality," Rationality, Rules, and Ideals, ed. by Sinnott-Armstrong (2002) 
"Moral Realism," Oxford Handbook of Moral Theory, ed. by Copp (2006)
"Moral Semantics and Empirical Enquiry," Moral Psychology, ed. by Sinnott-Armstrong (2008) 
"Hume on Practical Morality and Inert Reason," Oxford Studies in Metaethics, ed. by Shafer-Landau (2008)
"Sentiments and Spectators: Adam Smith's Theory of Moral Judgment," The Philosophy of Adam Smith, ed. by Brown and Fleischacker (2010)
 “Real World Theory, Complacency, and Aspiration,” with Geoff Brennan, in Philosophical Studies (2020) 178, https://doi.org/10.1007/s11098-020-01531-x.
 “Hume’s Robust Theory of Practical Reason,” in Routledge Handbook of Practical Reason, ed. by
Ruth Chang and Kurt Sylvan (Routledge, 2021), pp. 141-159.
 “On Cooperation,” with Geoff Brennan, in Analyse & Kritik, January 2018, Vol. 40, pp. 107-130.
 “Hume’s Theory of Public Reason,” Public Reason in Political Philosophy: Classic Sources and Contemporary Commentaries, edited by Gerald Gaus and Piers Turner (Routledge, 2017), pp. 303-329.
 “Do Normative Facts Matter...To What Is Feasible?” with Geoff Brennan, in Social Philosophy and Policy, 2016, vol. 33, #1-2, pp. 434 - 456.
 “Hume on the Artificial Virtues,” in the Oxford Handbook of David Hume, edited by Paul Russell (Oxford University Press, 2016), pp. 435-469.

Edited volumes 
Essays on Moral Realism (Cornell University Press, 1988)
Hume: Moral Philosophy (Hackett Publishing, 2006)
Philosophy, Politics, and Economics (Oxford University Press, 2015), with Jonathan Anomaly, Geoffrey Brennan, and Michael Munger.

See also
American philosophy
List of American philosophers

References

External links
Geoffrey Sayre-McCord's webpage at UNC-Chapel Hill
Geoffrey Sayre-McCord's personal webpage
Papers available on-line
Sayre-McCord on Bloggingheads.tv discussing meta-ethics
Sayre-McCord on Bloggingheads.tv discussing ethics and evolution

Sayre-McCord lecture on The Nature of Normative Concepts
Interview in Freakanomics story on Joan McCord's research
WiPhi video on the Prisoner's Dilemma

1956 births
20th-century American essayists
20th-century American male writers
20th-century American non-fiction writers
20th-century American philosophers
21st-century American essayists
21st-century American male writers
21st-century American non-fiction writers
21st-century American philosophers
American ethicists
American logicians
American male essayists
American male non-fiction writers
American philosophy academics
Epistemologists
Historians of philosophy
Living people
Metaphilosophers
Metaphysicians
Metaphysics writers
Moral realists
Oberlin College alumni
Ontologists
Philosophers of culture
Philosophers of economics
Philosophers of logic
Philosophers of social science
Political philosophers
Social philosophers
University of North Carolina at Chapel Hill faculty
University of Pittsburgh alumni
Writers from Boston